Alexander Tulloch Macqueen (born 30 November 1973) is an English actor. He has appeared on television, film and radio in the UK in productions such as Holby City,  Doctor Who, Hut 33, Peep Show, The Thick of It, Keeping Mum, Fate: The Winx Saga, and The Inbetweeners.  He also guest-starred in The Durrells in Series 4.

Early life
Macqueen was born in Epsom, Surrey. He was educated at St John's School, Leatherhead, and left to receive a first in English literature at Collingwood College, Durham University. He went on to study for a M.Phil at Pembroke College, Cambridge, graduating in 1998.

Professional career
Macqueen was a member of the National Youth Theatre between 1992 and 1995, then trained as a barrister at the Middle Temple. He worked as a Business Affairs Executive for Granada International and has worked in the House of Commons with a member of the Culture and Media Select Committee, during the creation of the Broadcasting Act 1996.

He played sarcastic consultant anaesthetist Keith Greene in 75 episodes of Holby City between May 2005 and July 2010. He appeared as Julius Nicholson, the "blue-skies advisor" to the Prime Minister in political satire The Thick of It and as Sir Jonathan Tutt, British Ambassador to the UN, in the film In the Loop, both directed by Armando Iannucci. He also appeared in the Comic Relief special of Mr. Bean in 2007 as a vicar. He appeared as Kevin Sutherland in E4's comedy, The Inbetweeners and as Howard, an anti-speed bump community campaigner in two episodes of BBC1's Outnumbered.

Macqueen has appeared in television advertisements for Specsavers, Dell, and Utterly Butterly. He appeared in the Comedy Central/BBC collaboration, Kröd Mändoon and the Flaming Sword of Fire, in which he played Barnabus, the sidekick to the Chancellor Dongalor, played by Matt Lucas. He starred as Roy Tunt in The Hide, which premiered on FilmFour in February 2009. He won the award for Best Actor at the Marbella Film Festival in 2009 for this role.

Macqueen has appeared in a series of videos on YouTube as Clive Rudloe, a character who claims to be "the world's number one DJ". The videos are spoofs created by real-life DJs Above and Beyond. In late 2009, he starred in several episodes of The News at Bedtime on BBC Radio 4, in a variety of supporting roles. In 2010, he appeared as the publisher Malcolm Dodds in Woody Allen's You Will Meet a Tall Dark Stranger. That year he also had a small role in the comedy film Four Lions. In 2011, he appeared in "The National Anthem", an episode of the anthology series Black Mirror.

In 2012, he appeared in a Doctor Who spin-off UNIT: Dominion, published by Big Finish Productions, in a role described as "the Other Doctor" who is revealed to be the Doctor's long-term adversary The Master; the storyline establishes that Macqueen's Master is intended to be from a point between the Masters portrayed by Eric Roberts and Derek Jacobi. He reprised this role in 2014 for Dark Eyes 2, Dark Eyes 3 and Dark Eyes 4. He reprised the role again in 2016 alongside Geoffrey Beevers, who had played an earlier incarnation of the Master, in The Two Masters. In 2021 MacQueen returned to the role in Masterful, a story published to celebrate the Master's 50th anniversary. He also appeared in a lead role as Edmund in Julia Davis' black period comedy Hunderby, opposite Davis and Alexandra Roach.

He played the role of Hove in the 2015 BBC series Pompidou, starring alongside Matt Lucas. During the filming of Pompidou, Macqueen and Matt Lucas played the game devised by the two ‘Pumpidou’. Lucas however won no critical acclaim for ‘Pumpidou’, despite it being the key spin off to the show. However, Macqueen did receive a special recognition award for the 2015 edition of TOTY for his part in the success of ‘Pumpidou’. He played Luke, the senior doctor in the six-part ITV comedy The Delivery Man. In 2015, he also played the royal crier in Cinderella. In 2016, he appeared opposite Sir Michael Caine in the film Youth, and played the role of Patrick Jarvis MP in series 3 of Peaky Blinders.

Filmography

Film

Television

References

External links

1973 births
Alumni of Pembroke College, Cambridge
English male film actors
English male soap opera actors
Living people
People from Epsom
Male actors from Surrey
People educated at St John's School, Leatherhead
National Youth Theatre members
Alumni of Collingwood College, Durham